St Denis' Church, Morton is a Grade II* listed parish church in the Church of England in Morton, Nottinghamshire.

History

The church dates from 1756.

The church is in a joint parish with: 
St Peter and St Paul's Church, Upton
Holy Trinity Church, Rolleston

Organ

The current organ was installed in 1967 by Cantril of Castle Donington. It was originally built by W Hadfield of London.

References

Church of England church buildings in Nottinghamshire
Grade II* listed churches in Nottinghamshire
Churches completed in 1756